George William Knight III (December 16, 1931 – October 11, 2021) was an ordained minister in the Orthodox Presbyterian Church. He was a theologian, author, preacher, churchman, and adjunct professor of New Testament at Greenville Presbyterian Theological Seminary in Taylors, South Carolina. Formerly, he was the founding Dean and Professor of New Testament at Knox Theological Seminary.  Prior to his appointment at Knox Theological Seminary, he taught New Testament and New Testament Greek at Covenant Theological Seminary in St. Louis, Missouri. As a pastor, he planted Covenant Presbyterian Church in Naples, Florida and has served numerous other local churches in the Presbyterian Church in America and the Orthodox Presbyterian Church. A former president of the Evangelical Theological Society, he has also taught and preached the Bible at many other seminaries and churches around the world. He has authored several works, most notably The Pastoral Epistles and a short commentary of Timothy and Titus as included in the Baker Commentary on the Bible. He received his theological doctorate from Free University of Amsterdam in 1968. Dr. Knight was a member of the General Assembly-appointed Ad Interim Committee to study the number of ordained offices in the Presbyterian Church in America according to Scripture. His Ad Interim Report of the Number of Offices by George W. Knight III  was incorporated into the polity of the Presbyterian Church in America. He also served on an ad interim committee to study the issue of marriage, divorce and remarriage, which brought about the 1992 publication of a Position Paper of the Presbyterian Church in America on Remarriage and Divorce, 1992. .

In 1977, he argued in a book about gender roles that the role relationship of men and women is theologically analogous to the subordination of the Son to the Father in the Trinity. Australian theologian Kevin Giles has more recently responded that complementarians have "reinvented" the doctrine of the Trinity to support their views of men and women, suggesting that some complementarians have adopted a heretical view of the Trinity similar to Arianism. Knight released a response to "evangelical feminists" in a 2009 book. Knight's contributions to the complementarian view of the role relationship of men and women, and especially as it is applied to the issue of the ordination of women to the ministry, have greatly influenced the founding of the Council on Biblical Manhood and Womanhood, where he served for many years as a council member.

Works

Books

Articles and chapters

References

1931 births
2021 deaths
American Calvinist and Reformed theologians
Covenant Theological Seminary faculty
Orthodox Presbyterian Church ministers
20th-century Protestant theologians
Vrije Universiteit Amsterdam alumni
American biblical scholars
New Testament scholars
People from Sanford, Florida